Alpha Fornacis (α Fornacis, abbreviated Alpha For, α For) is a binary star system in the southern constellation of Fornax. It is the brightest star in the constellation and the only one brighter than magnitude 4.0. Based on parallax measurements obtained during the Hipparcos mission, it is approximately 46 light-years (14 parsecs) distant from the Sun.

Its two components are designated Alpha Fornacis A (officially named Dalim ) and B.

Nomenclature 

α Fornacis (Latinised to Alpha Fornacis) is the system's Bayer designation. The designations of the two components as Alpha Fornacis A and B derive from the convention used by the Washington Multiplicity Catalog (WMC) for multiple star systems, and adopted by the International Astronomical Union (IAU). Formerly it was designated as the 12th of Eridanus (12 Eri) by Flamsteed.

Indigenous Arabs had named both Alpha Eridani and Fomalhaut ظَلِيم al-ẓalīm, a local word for 'ostrich'. Later, Arabian astronomer would transfer the appellation to Theta Eridani, as they could not see those other stars from their location.
In recent times, Italian astronomer Giuseppe Piazzi applied it with the spelling Dalim to his "III 13" (= α For) in his Palermo Catalogue, and Elijah Burritt labeled it Fornacis in his Atlas.

In 2016, the IAU organized a Working Group on Star Names (WGSN) to catalog and standardize proper names for stars. The WGSN decided to attribute proper names to individual stars rather than entire multiple systems. It approved the name Dalim for the component Alpha Fornacis A on 5 September 2017 and it is now so included in the List of IAU-approved Star Names.

Properties 

Alpha Fornacis has a high proper motion and the system displays an excess of infrared emission, which may indicate the presence of circumstellar material such as a debris disk. The space velocity components of this star are (U, V, W) = (−35, +20, +30) km/s. Approximately 350,000 years ago, Alpha Fornacis experienced a close encounter with the A-type main-sequence star Nu Horologii. The two came within an estimated  of each other, and both stars have debris disks.

Alpha Fornacis A has a stellar classification of F8IV, where the luminosity class IV indicates this is a subgiant star that has just evolved off the main sequence. It has 33% more mass than the Sun and is an estimated 2.9 billion years old.

The secondary, Alpha Fornacis B, has been identified as a blue straggler, and has either accumulated material from, or merged with, a third star in the past. It is a strong source of X-rays and is 78% as massive as the Sun.

References

External links 
 α For (Dalim) – SKY-MAP.ORG
 LHL Digital Collections – Linda Hall library

F-type subgiants
Fornacis, Alpha
Blue stragglers
Binary stars
Fornax (constellation)
Fornacis, Alpha
CD−29 1177
Circumstellar disks
Eridani, 12
0127
020010
014879
0127
Dalim
J03120443-2859156